Below the Line (Ispod crte) is a 2003 Croatian film directed by Petar Krelja, starring Rakan Rushaidat and Leona Paraminski.

Sources

External links
 

2003 films
Croatian drama films
2000s Croatian-language films